The list of ship launches in 1850 includes a chronological list of some ships launched in 1850.


References

Sources

1850
Ship launches